Alta High School may refer to:

In the United States 
Alta High School (Utah), Sandy, Utah
Alta High School (Iowa), Alta, Iowa